Strumella is a genus of fungi in the family Sarcosomataceae. Species in this genus are anamorphic forms of the genus Urnula.

External links
Index Fungorum

Pezizales
Pezizales genera